Ararad is a daily Lebanese Armenian newspaper and the official organ of the Armenian Social Democrat Hunchakian Party (Henchak) in Lebanon. It is a four-page daily. Its executive director is Ani Yepremian since September 2012.

History
Hunchakian activist Mihran Aghazarian planned to publish Ararad in 1933, but was killed 2 days before the start. Ararad was established in 1937 and the first issue appeared on 12 November 1937 in Beirut, Lebanon. First editor was Armenak Eloyan (1937-1939). Another former editor was Aharoun Shekerdemian.

It used to be published daily until 2000, but from June 2001 to 2007, it was published weekly. Today it is published daily. From 1956 to 1965, a literary supplement of the newspaper called Ararad Kragan was also published. It was a literal monthly edited by Hakob Noruni.

References

External links
Official website

1937 establishments in Lebanon
Armenian-language newspapers published in Lebanon
Communist newspapers
Newspapers published in Beirut
Newspapers established in 1937
Social Democrat Hunchakian Party
Daily newspapers published in Lebanon
Weekly newspapers published in Lebanon